Russell H. Dilday is a pastor, educator, former seminary president, and chancellor of B.H. Carroll Theological Institute. He is best known for his tenure as President of Southwestern Baptist Theological Seminary until his abrupt dismissal in 1994 during the Southern Baptist Convention conservative resurgence.

Career
He served as President of Southwestern Baptist Theological Seminary starting in 1978. During his sixteen-year tenure, the seminary annual enrollment exceeded 5000 students, making it the largest in American theological education nhistory.  In 1990, Christianity Today released a poll of its readers ranking the effectiveness of American seminaries.  Southwestern Seminary was ranked “number one among the top 33 graduate theological schools in the nation.   

He was fired in March 1994 by what had become majority conservative-leaning board of trustees in a 26-7 vote during the Southern Baptist Convention conservative resurgence.  Dilday described the resurgence as having fragmented Southern Baptist fellowship and as being "far more serious than a controversy". Dilday described it as being "a self-destructive, contentious, one-sided feud that at times took on combative characteristics". 

Since 1979, Southern Baptists had become polarized into two major groups: moderates and conservatives. Dilday has been labeled a moderate, but prefers the term "constructive conservative." Reflecting the hyper-conservative majority votes of delegates at the 1979 annual meeting of the SBC, the new national organization officers and committees replaced all leaders of Southern Baptist agencies with presumably more conservative people (often dubbed "fundamentalists" by dissenters) who would carry out the takeover agenda.

In August 1994, Dilday was hired by Baylor University to serve as a distinguished professor of homiletics at the George W. Truett Theological Seminary and to be a special assistant to Baylor President Herbert Reynolds. He also served as Acting Dean of Truett Seminary. 

He served as interim President of Howard Payne University from 2002–3.

He was pastor of Texas Baptist churches including First Church in Antelope, Texas, a rural congregation, First Church in Clifton; and he led Tallowood Church in Houston "from a mission to one of the strongest missions churches in Texas Baptist life." His only non-Texas pastorate was at Second-Ponce de Leon Baptist Church in Atlanta, a large urban congregation.

Dr. Dilday has received honorary degrees from Baylor University (L.L.D), Mercer University (D.D.), William Jewell College (L.H.D.) and Dallas Baptist University (D. Hum.).

Education
He earned degrees from Baylor University (B.A.) and Southwestern Baptist Theological Seminary (M.Div., Ph.D.).

Writings
You Can Overcome Discouragement, 1977

The Doctrine of Biblical Authority, 1989

Personal Computer: A New Tool for Ministers, 1985

Communicator's Commentary: I & II Kings, which was a Gold Medallion Award finalist for the “Best Commentary,” 1988, 

Columns: Glimpses of a Seminary Under Assault, Oct. 2004, that revisits Dilday's monthly presidential columns at Southwestern.

Higher Ground: A Call for Christian Civility, 2007.

Honors
Dilday is highly respected for his denominational leadership and has been recognized by Texas Monthly magazine as one of the "Texas Twenty" – persons across the state who "have proved to be pivotal forces in their respective fields – and, by extension, in Texas." He was also named by The Baptist Standard as one of the "ten most influential Texas Baptists in the twentieth century."

Family
A native Texan, Dilday grew up in a Texas Baptist minister's home. His father, Hooper Dilday, served a number of Texas churches, and was on the staff of the Baptist General Convention of Texas for 20 years in Sunday school, discipleship training and church services, and was longtime minister of education at First Church in Wichita Falls. His mother Opal Spillers Dilday was born in Memphis, Texas, and was a children's educational specialist in Baptist churches in Amarillo, Port Arthur, Port Neches, Wichita Falls and Dallas.

Sources
Southwestern Baptist Theological Seminary "In 1994, the seminary experienced a sudden change in leadership with the dismissal of Russell H. Dilday as president and the appointment…"
B. H. Carroll Theological Institute "The institute's founding chancellor is Russell H. Dilday, a former president of Southwestern Baptist Theological Seminary, who launched…"
Southern Baptist Convention Conservative Resurgence: "Dr. Russell H. Dilday, president of Southwestern Baptist Theological Seminary from 1978 to 1994, has analogized what he calls "the…"
Southern Baptist Convention "Dilday, Russell. Higher Ground: A Call for Christian Civility. Macon, Georgia: Smyth and Helwys…"
Howard Payne University "Dr. Russell H. Dilday (Interim President) 2002–2003"
Baptist Faith and Message "Russell H. Dilday. An Analysis of the Baptist Faith and Message 2000."

References

External links
 July 29, 2012 Sermon at  Tallowood Baptist Church, Houston, TX

Year of birth missing (living people)
Living people
Baylor University alumni
Southwestern Baptist Theological Seminary alumni
Southern Baptist ministers
American Baptist theologians
Seminary presidents
Southwestern Baptist Theological Seminary faculty